Together for the People (JPP) is a Portuguese political party, with its origins in Santa Cruz, Madeira. Its founding principles are Unity, Transparency and Resistance, as evidenced by its symbol. It was legalised by the Portuguese Constitutional Court on 27 January 2015.

It started in the parish of Santa Cruz, Madeira as an independent movement where it won the 2013 local elections with an absolute majority with Filipe Sousa as head.

After the victory, it was decided to turn the movement into a political party, in March 2014, having submitted over 10 thousand signatures (more than the 7,500 required by law) to the Constitutional Court in November 2014.

It was formed in order to run in the 2015 Madeiran regional elections, because the Portuguese Constitution does not allow for the candidacy of independents to the country's legislative organs or the existence of regional parties, making the JPP available to run in any election of the country. It won five seats in the 2015 Madeira regional elections with 10.34% of the votes, a total of 13,229 votes.

References

2014 establishments in Portugal
Centrist parties in Portugal
Liberal parties in Portugal
Political parties established in 2014
Political parties in Portugal